FC Torentul Chişinău was a Moldovan football club based in Chişinău, Moldova. They played in the Moldovan National Division, the top division in Moldovan football.

History
The club was established in 1992 as Dinamo-Codru Chișinău based on the Soviet club Moldovgidromaș Chișinău (1980–1991).

1992 – renaming in Dinamo Chişinău
1993 – renaming in Torentul Chişinău
1996 – dissolution

List of seasons

References

External links
 FC Torentul Chişinău at WeltFussballArchive 

Football clubs in Moldova
Defunct football clubs in Moldova
Association football clubs disestablished in 1996
1996 disestablishments in Moldova